A Cold Case is a 2002 work of nonfiction by Philip Gourevitch. A film adaptation of the book starring Tom Hanks was attempted, but the project did not enter production.

Plot summary
A Cold Case follows real-life chief investigator Andy Rosenzweig from the Manhattan District Attorney's office as he investigates the 1970 murders of Richie Glennon and Pete McGinn, a case which was seemingly closed too soon. An ex-con, Frank Gilbert Koehler, is finally arrested in 1997.

Film adaptation
A Cold Case was originally slated to have a film adaptation starring Tom Hanks after the actor's performances in The Terminal (2004) and The Ladykillers (2004). Director Mark Romanek was signed to helm the project with a script by John Sayles and Eric Roth, but when Hanks chose to do The Polar Express (2004) instead, the project came to a halt.

References

External links
 Book review at Entertainment Weekly
 Presentation by Gourevitch on A Cold Case, August 14, 2001, C-SPAN

2002 American novels
American crime novels